Christine Langenfeld (born 16 August 1962) is a German jurist who is currently serving as a judge in the Federal Constitutional Court in the second senate.

Early life and education
Langenfeld was born in Luxembourg to late Carl-Ludwig Wagner. From 1980 to 1986, she studied each for a 2-year term, Jurisprudence at the University of Trier, University of Burgundy and University of Mainz. In 1986, she finished her first Staatsexam in Mainz. Langenfeld became a Research assistant for Public law and European Union law at the University of Mainz for Dr. Eckart Klein from 1986 to 1987. She finished her second Staatsexam in 1991.

Career
Langenfeld was nominated by the German Bundesrat as a justice for the second senate of the Federal Constitutional Court of Germany in 2016 and is currently serving a 12-year term until 2028.

Other activities
 Max Planck Institute for the Study of Crime, Security and Law, Member of the Board of Trustees

Personal life
Langenfeld is married to Harald Langenfeld with whom she has a daughter and resides in Leipzig.

References 

Living people
1962 births
Justices of the Federal Constitutional Court
University of Burgundy alumni
Johannes Gutenberg University Mainz alumni
University of Trier alumni
Constitutional court women judges
German women judges
21st-century German judges
21st-century women judges
21st-century German women